The Oath (行医) is a medical drama produced by Wawa Pictures. It stars Christopher Lee, Jesseca Liu, Ix Shen, Ann Kok, Zhang Zhenhuan & Kate Pang as casts of the series. The drama follows a Chinese physician and a Western doctor on a complex medical case.

The series premiered in Singapore on 25 October 2011, on Mediacorp Channel 8. This drama is the first Wawa Pictures drama to be broadcast on Channel 8.

The series is available for streaming on Netflix.

Synopsis
Two doctors with opposite approaches to treating patients clash on the job and must learn to trust each other's expertise, allowing love to bloom.

Cast List

Songs
The theme song is 救命 by American-Taiwanese singer Anthony Neely in his latest album Wake Up. Other side tracks include 《海枯石烂》 by Olivia Ong and 《还是要幸福》 by Hebe Tian.

Overseas broadcast

The Oath also premiered in NTV7, which is a Malaysian broadcasting corporation, at 6pm, 5 times a week.

The series finale aired on 4 Dec 2012.

2012 Accolades
The other dramas that are nominated for Best Theme Songs are Secrets of Sale, A Song to Remember, Devotion and Kampong Ties. Although Yvonne Lim is a cameo in the drama, she is surprisingly nominated for the Best Supporting Actress award.

References

See also
List of programmes broadcast by MediaCorp Channel 8
List of The Oath episodes

2011 Singaporean television series debuts
2011 Singaporean television series endings
Singapore Chinese dramas
Singaporean medical television series
Channel 8 (Singapore) original programming